Frank Joseph Myers (born July 3, 1957) is an American country music singer, songwriter, and record producer. He has received multiple awards including a Grammy for "Best Country Song" which he and frequent songwriting partner Gary Baker (formerly of The Shooters) received in 1995 for the song "I Swear".  In his career, he has written songs for John Michael Montgomery, Eddie Rabbitt, Crystal Gayle, Lonestar and others. He has also recorded two albums, "Baker & Myers" in 1995 and "Scrapbook" in 2006.

Biography

Family
Frank is the son of Melvin "Pee Wee" Myers (1923–1984) and Eva Riggs. Frank married Belinda in 1980 and has 2 sons Josh and Nick, and a daughter, Jessica. Frank has 2 brothers Melvin and Doug and 2 sisters Betty and Joyce.

Early years
Frank J. Myers grew up in Dayton, Ohio and graduated from Northridge High School. He returns yearly to hold a concert "Country on the 'Ridge" as a fundraiser for the school's Alumni Hall of Fame. His father, Melvin "Pee Wee" Myers, was a champion fiddle player and singer who taught Frank how to play the guitar. Frank started performing at age 11. After winning a local contest called StarTrail he started opening shows at Dayton's Hara Arena. He still has close ties with the community.

At 14 he guest-starred on the Porter Wagoner TV show. Frank and his brother Melvin Jr. formed a group called "Country Earth" with Paul Barton and Ted Hartman. During his time in Country Earth he met his wife Belinda Watkins. They married on June 7, 1980.

Nashville
In 1981, Myers and his wife moved to Nashville, Tennessee to pursue his career in the music business. Myers was hired by Eddy Raven as a guitar player. He later became the band leader and road manager for Raven. It was within this time while working for Raven that Myers started writing, playing, and co-producing songs. They produced two number ones, five number twos, and three top ten songs. These include "I Got Mexico", "Bayou Boys", "You Should've Been Gone By Now", and "Sometimes A Lady".

In 1982, Myers wrote "You and I" for his wife. It became his first single by Eddie Rabbitt and Crystal Gayle. "You and I" was the number one country song for four weeks, number two AC for two weeks, and number six Pop for 4 weeks. While working for Raven, Myers met Gary Baker with whom he later became the songwriting duo Baker & Myers.

Myers left Raven in 1990 to play for Marie Osmond. He was also able to get Baker a job with Marie playing bass after Gary's band The Shooters disbanded. It was during this time that Frank and Gary's songwriting flourished. They had their first number one together in 1993 called "Once Upon a Lifetime" by Alabama.

In 1987, Frank and Gary wrote the song "I Swear" which was recorded by John Michael Montgomery and All-4-One in 1994. "I Swear" has received numerous awards including a Grammy Award for "Country song of the year" and A.C.M. Award for Single and Song of the Year along with going number one in numerous countries.

In 1995, Myers and Gary signed and recorded a record for MCG/Curb Records as Baker & Myers. Although Baker & Myers never recorded after the release of that album, Myers and Gary have continued their careers as songwriters.

In 2001, Myers co-wrote two number ones, "I'm_Already_There", BMI's 2002 Country Song of the year, and "My Front Porch Looking In" for Lonestar.

In 2006, Myers produced his first solo album, Scrapbook, for FJM Productions. It is an album of hit songs Myers has written over the years and sung by Frank himself. The first song, "You and I", Myers sings with Crystal Gayle who originally sang it with Eddie Rabbitt.

In 2008, Myers wrote seven songs and produced Richie McDonald's album I Turn to You and also co-produced his Christmas CD If Everyday Could Be Christmas. As of late, he continues to work with other artists writing and producing songs.

In 2015 Myers and Billy Montana wrote and recorded a song, entitled "I’m Here For You", to benefit T.A.P.S.

Filmography

Discography
List of songs written by Frank J. Myers

Albums

Scrapbook (2006)

"You and I" (with Special Guest Crystal Gayle) – 3:58
"I Got Mexico" – 2:26
"You Should've Been Gone by Now" – 3:26
"Once Upon a Lifetime" – 4:02
"T.L.C.A.S.A.P." – 3:27
"Come In Out of the Pain" – 3:29
"Sometimes a Lady" – 3:17
"I Swear" – 4:21
"My Front Porch Looking In" – 3:22
"I'm Already There" – 3:54
"What Say You" – 3:29

List of singles written by Frank Myers

See also
Baker & Myers

References

External links
Frank Myers official website
Bio at Horipro Entertainment

Frank Myers at CD Baby
Frank Myers at iTunes
Frank Myers and Gary Baker perform "You & I" on YouTube
Frank Myers performs Front Porch Looking In on YouTube

American country singer-songwriters
Record producers from Ohio
Living people
Musicians from Dayton, Ohio
Singer-songwriters from Ohio
1957 births
Country musicians from Ohio